Machine Punch Through: The Singles Collection is an album by the Canadian alternative rock band Moist, released in 2001. The album featured one new song, "Sunday Comes," previously issued on the "Breathe" remix single. The remainder of the album was a compilation of previous singles. The album would be the band's last before their unplanned 12-year hiatus, and the last to feature band members Paul Wilcox.

Early copies of the album were also released with a second six-song bonus disc, compiling songs that the band had released on movie soundtracks or as fan club singles. There are also DVD video and DVD audio versions of this collection, the former containing all of the band's music videos and tour footage, the latter containing the audio CD in enhanced resolution.

Track listing
All songs written by Moist.

Audio CD
 "Resurrection" — 3:59
 "Underground (Radio Mix)" — 4:12
 "Silver" — 4:17
 "Breathe" — 4:54
 "Tangerine" — 4:05
 "Leave It Alone" — 4:27
 "Comes And Goes (Modern Rock Mix)" — 3:47
 "Push" — 3:53
 "Gasoline (Radio Mix)" — 3:35
 "See Touch Feel" — 3:24
 "Believe Me" — 3:54
 "Dogs" — 4:34
 "Machine Punch Through" — 4:28
 "Sunday Comes" — 4:18

Bonus Disc
 "Sweet Electric Child" — 3:28
 "Day" — 2:59
 "Claus" — 3:18
 "Gone Again" — 4:42
 "Morphine" — 5:38
 "You Remind Me" — 3:32

DVD
 "Underground"
 "Silver"
 "Resurrection"
 "Leave It Alone"
 "Freaky Be Beautiful"
 "Gasoline"
 "Believe Me"
 "Tangerine"
 "Breathe"
 "Push"
 "Resurrection (Live)"
 "Tangerine (remix)"

Special features, listed from Amazon.com:
 Commentary
 Live footage and tour video
 Short film bio
 Discography
 Biography
 Web links
 Hidden features & surprises
 Audio only option

Personnel
David Usher - vocals
Jeff Pearce - bass
Mark Makoway - guitar
Kevin Young - keyboard/piano
Paul Wilcox - drums

2001 greatest hits albums
Moist (Canadian band) albums